Luke Slater (born 12 June 1968, Reading, Berkshire, England) is an English electronic musician, DJ and record producer, who has concentrated on techno since the beginning of the 1990s. He achieved break through commercial success with his tracks "Love" (1997) and "All Exhale" (1999).

As well as releasing many tracks and albums under his own name, Slater has recorded and performed under a number of aliases, the best known being Planetary Assault Systems, the 7th Plain, L.B. Dub Corp and LSD.

Early life
Born in Reading and raised in Horley, Slater's early sound dalliances with his father's reel to reel tape recorder and his drumming stints led to work in local record shops, including Jelly Jam in Brighton. By 1988, Slater was immersed in the embryonic acid house scene, DJing in London's Heaven nightclub.

Music
Slater began releasing original tracks under various aliases, following his single debut in 1989 with "Momentary Vision". Releases followed on Djax as Clementine, on General Production Recordings as 7th Plain, and as Morganistic (with Alan Sage), and especially on Peacefrog Records, with nearly a dozen of releases as The X-Tront and as Planetary Assault Systems.

After releasing four albums on Peacefrog, he issued 1997's Freek Funk and Wireless two years later. His tracks "All Exhale" (2000) and "Nothing at All" (2002) reached #74 and #70 respectively in the UK Singles Chart. His first volume of the mix series Fear and Loathing appeared in 2001, on the React label. Alright on Top (2002) was an "album of songs" with vocals from Ricky Barrows and others featured on every track. The second volume of Fear and Loathing appeared in late 2004.

Slater has released a mix for the Fabric DJ-mix series, and has reinvented innumerable tracks in remixes from artists such as Depeche Mode and Ken Ishii to more recent remixes for Radial and Soul Designer. In 2006, Slater set up his own label, Mote-Evolver, releasing limited 12" records and digital downloads through the Mote-Evolver and N.E.W.S. websites.

In 2014 he launched a podcast entitled The Spaceship.

Pseudonyms
Planetary Assault Systems (releases on Peacefrog Records, Mote-Evolver, Figure, Token and Ostgut Ton)
The 7th Plain (releases on General Production Recordings and Ostguton Berlin)
Clementine (releases on Djax Records)
L.B. Dub Corp (releases on Mote-Evolver and Ostgut Ton)
Own name (releases on Peacefrog Records, novamute, Mute Records and Mote-Evolver)

Selected discography
(As Luke Slater)                         
X-Tront Vol. 2 (1993)
Freek Funk (1997)
Wireless (1999)
Alright on Top (2002)

(As The 7th Plain)
My Yellow Wise Rug (1994)
The 4 Cornered Room (1994)

(As Planetary Assault Systems)
The Drone Sector (1997)
The Electric Funk Machine (1997)
Atomic Funkster (2001)
Temporary Suspension (2009)
The Messenger (2011)
Arc Angel (2016)
”Straight Shooting" (2019)

(With LSD)
Process (2017)
 Second Process (2019)

References

External links
Mote-evolver website
Luke Slater at Discogs
Luke Slater para fans de habla Hispana

1968 births
Living people
English DJs
English electronic musicians
People from Horley
People from Reading, Berkshire
Mute Records artists
English techno musicians
Peacefrog Records artists
Electronic dance music DJs